Bhangaha (Nepali: भँगाहा ) is a municipality in Mahottari District in Province No. 2 of Nepal. It was formed in 2016 occupying current 9 sections (wards) from previous 9 VDCs. It occupies an area of 77.21 sq. km with a total population of 46,754.

References

Populated places in Mahottari District
Nepal municipalities established in 2017
Municipalities in Madhesh Province